Cheam Yeab  (born 22 October 1946) is a Cambodian politician. He belongs to the Cambodian People's Party and was elected to represent Prey Veng Province in the National Assembly of Cambodia in 2003.

References

1946 births
Members of the National Assembly (Cambodia)
Cambodian People's Party politicians
Living people